Hell House is a 2002 documentary directed by George Ratliff. It focusses on one of many hell houses, Christian haunted attraction, located in this instance in Cedar Hill, Texas.

Synopsis 
The film follows the youth group of the Cedar Hill Trinity Church, documenting the work involved in creating the Hell house, the performances themselves, and the personal lives of some of the participants.

Reception
The film holds a rating of 94% "certified fresh" on review aggregator Rotten Tomatoes based on 34 reviews. A reviewer for the New York Times "Through such generalizations are destructive stereotypes born, on both the left and the right."

Background
Ratliff, in a NPR interview, said the motivation for making the documentary was to display the Christian right in the United States. The documentary films the annual Halloween show at the Assemblies of God church. Ratliff said the Hell House was invented by this church and that it had been franchised all over the world. 

The Assemblies of God's annual Hell House, on which the documentary film is based on, is a "fire and brimstone"-style show with a concluding death scene followed by a trip to hell, followed by an invitation to the audience to accept Christ], thus saving their souls. Presentations during the show include a death scene due to HIV, an abortion, a school shooting, date rape, suicide, and a fatal drunk driving accident.

References

External links
 
 
 Production Company Ghost Robot

2002 films
American documentary films
Documentary films critical of Christianity
Halloween in the United States
2000s English-language films
2000s American films